Ponnum Kudthinu Pottu is a 1986 Indian Malayalam-language film, directed by T. S. Suresh Babu and produced by M. Mani. The film stars Jagathy Sreekumar, Nedumudi Venu, Shankar and Menaka. The film's score was composed by Shyam.

Plot
Eravi Pillai tries to sell his old house but no one is interested in it and he tries to transfer it to anyone willing. Later he finds out that there is a treasure hidden in the house buried by his ancestors, and he tries to reclaim the house for the treasure.

Cast
Jagathy Sreekumar as Eraviraman Pillai
Nedumudi Venu as Dasan
Shankar as Gopan
Menaka as Sethubhai
Mukesh as College student
Jagadish as College student
Maniyanpilla Raju as College student
Innocent as Chandu Panikker
Mala Aravindan as Ayyappan
Kuthiravattom Pappu as Ganikan
Poojappura Ravi as Thoma
V. D. Rajappan as Raghavan
Rohini as Rani
Thikkurussy as Kunjiraman
Lalithasree as Jaanu
Paravoor Bharathan as Principal
Thodupuzha Vasanthy as Karthyayani
Kollam Ajith as Gunda
Poojappura Radhakrishnan as Abutty
Vishnuprakash as Gunda

Soundtrack
The music was composed by Shyam with lyrics by Chunakkara Ramankutty.

References

External links
 

1986 films
1980s Malayalam-language films